Vsevolod Mikhailovich Eikhenbaum (18 September 1945), commonly known by his pseudonym Volin, was a Russian anarchist intellectual. He became involved in revolutionary socialist politics during the 1905 Russian Revolution, for which he was forced into exile, where he gravitated towards anarcho-syndicalism.

He returned to Petrograd following the February Revolution of 1917 and propagandised for anarcho-syndicalism in the Russian capital. In the wake of the October Revolution, which he criticised for bringing the Bolsheviks to power, he left for Ukraine, where he became a leading figure in the Makhnovshchina. During this time, he developed a theory of synthesis anarchism, which advocated for collaboration between anarchists of different tendencies, and spearheaded the intellectual development of Ukrainian anarchism, as leader of the Nabat and chair of the third Military Revolutionary Council during the civil war.

After the suppression of the Russian and Ukrainian anarchist movements by the Bolsheviks, Volin went again into exile. In Paris, he became a leading opponent of platformism, which he criticised as authoritarian, and found work as a prolific writer in multiple different languages. He lived out the last years of his life in poverty, evading persecution by the Nazis and the French State, as he was wanted for his Jewish heritage and his anarchist political convictions. He died of tuberculosis shortly after the liberation of France.

Early life 
His parents, both of whom were doctors, employed western tutors for Volin and his brother, Boris, who were educated in the French and German languages, in addition to Russian. After completing his education in Voronezh, Volin moved to Saint Petersburg, where he studied in the Faculty of Law at Saint Petersburg State University.

Political activism

By 1901, Volin had become involved in the imperial capital's nascent workers' movement, and in 1904, he dropped out of university to be a full-time activist for the Socialist Revolutionary Party. He mostly worked to educate workers as a tutor, also establishing a library and organising study groups. As a socialist revolutionary, he was involved in the 1905 Russian Revolution from its inception: witnessing the events of Bloody Sunday; participating in the establishment of the Saint Petersburg Soviet; before he was arrested for his part in an uprising at Kronstadt, for which he was briefly imprisoned in the Peter and Paul Fortress. Following the suppression of the revolution, in 1907, he was arrested again by the Okhrana and deported to Siberia, but was able to escape into exile in France.

After settling in Paris, Volin met a number of anarchists, including the French Sébastien Faure and the Russian Apollon Karelin. By 1911, he had committed himself to anarchism, leaving the Socialist Revolutionary Party and joining Karelin's Brotherhood of Free Communists. With the outbreak of World War I, Volin immediately joined the anti-war movement, catching the attention of the French authorities. He managed to evade capture and fled to the United States in 1915. Upon arriving in New York City, he joined the Union of Russian Workers, a Russian American anarcho-syndicalist organisation. He soon joined the editorial staff of its newspaper, Golos Truda, and in December 1916, he went on a speaking tour of North American cities. In the wake of the February Revolution, Volin returned to Russia. In July 1917, he and his colleagues from Golos Truda arrived in Petrograd, where they restarted publication of their newspaper, now propagating anarcho-syndicalism directly to the workers of the Russian capital.

Revolutionary activities
Volin quickly became a leading proponent of anarcho-syndicalism during the 1917 Revolution, calling for workers' control in his frequent speeches to the workers of Petrograd and as editor of Golos Truda, which expanded its circulation to 25,000 readers. In the wake of the October Revolution, he became a vocal critic of the Bolsheviks, warning of their authoritarian tendencies and predicting that they would see the power of the soviets usurped by the state. He particularly criticised the Treaty of Brest-Litovsk, which he considered to be a renouncement of world revolution by the Bolsheviks. He called for the prosecution of partisan warfare against the Central Powers and consequently decided to move to Ukraine, which had fallen under the occupation of the German Empire and Austria-Hungary.

After visiting relatives in Voronezh and spending a few months organising educational institutions for the local soviet in Bobrov, Volin moved to Kharkiv, where he participated in the establishment of the Nabat Confederation of Anarchist Organisations. On 18 November 1918, at the organisation's first conference in Kursk, he drew up a declaration of principles, which was designed to be acceptable to the three major anarchist schools of thought: communism, individualism and syndicalism. Volin's theory of synthesis anarchism, which encouraged anarchists of different tendencies to cooperate, was criticised as ineffective by his former anarcho-syndicalist comrades such as Grigorii Maksimov and Mark Mratchny. Nevertheless, Volin continued to advocate for his organisational theory through the Nabat, which grew to include autonomous branches throughout Ukraine, as well as a youth section and a publishing house. 

By mid-1919, the organisation had drawn the attention of the Bolsheviks, who closed its meeting places and shut down its newspaper press. In response, Volin moved the Nabat's headquarters to Huliaipole, where it became a central organisation within the Makhnovshchina, an anarchist mass movement led by Nestor Makhno's Revolutionary Insurgent Army of Ukraine. Volin joined the movement's Cultural-Educational Commission, serving as an editor for its publications and organising its regional congresses, even going on to act as chairman of the Military Revolutionary Council (RVS), the movement's executive body. As chair of the RVS, Volin clashed with the Insurgent Army's command over the excessive violence employed by the Kontrrazvedka. He also edited the movement's Draft Declaration, which proposed the establishment of free soviets as the basis for a transition towards a communist society. 

In December 1919, Volin went to Kryvyi Rih in order to counter the spread of Ukrainian nationalism in the region, but he contracted typhus and was forced to stop for recovery in a peasant village. On 14 January 1920, he was arrested on his sickbed by the 14th Army and given to the Cheka, who had orders from Leon Trotsky to execute him. Russian American anarchists such as Alexander Berkman attempted to appeal his sentence, but this was rejected by Nikolay Krestinsky, the general secretary of the Communist Party and a former colleague of Volin. Further appeals by Russian libertarians, including the Bolshevik Victor Serge, eventually secured his transfer to Butyrka prison in Moscow, where his death sentence was commuted. He was finally released in October 1920, as part of the terms of the Starobilsk agreement between the Bolsheviks and the Makhnovists, and he was even offered the post of People's Commissar for Education in the Ukrainian Soviet government, which he rejected. 

In November, he made a quick visit to Dmitrov, where he paid his respects to a dying Peter Kropotkin, who by then was pessimistic about the prospects of the revolution. Volin then returned to Kharkiv, where he began to prepare an All-Russian Congress of Anarchists to be held on 25 December, and led the negotiations with Christian Rakovsky's government over the controversial fourth political clause of the Starobilsk agreement, which would have provided for the autonomy of the Makhnovshchina. Following the soviet victory over the White movement in Crimea, he and other members of the Nabat were arrested and imprisoned again in Moscow. In July 1921, after being visited by Gaston Leval, a French syndicalist delegate to the Profintern, Volin and other anarchist political prisoners staged a hunger strike in order to draw the attention of other visiting trade union delegates. Following protests from the delegates to Vladimir Lenin, the prisoners were released and subsequently deported from Russia in January 1922.

Exile
Exiled in Berlin, Volin and his family were supported by German anarchists such as Rudolf Rocker, who provided them with a small attic to live in. While in the German capital, Volin worked with Alexander Berkman to provide support for anarchist political prisoners and exiles, including Nestor Makhno himself, who Volin helped escape from Poland to Berlin. He also published a weekly newspaper, The Anarchist Herald, translated Peter Arshinov's History of the Makhnovist Movement and publicised evidence of political repressions against Russian anarchists. In 1924, his old comrade Sébastien Faure invited him back to Paris to collaborate on the publication of his Anarchist Encyclopedia. Volin became a key contributor to the encyclopedia, as well as a number of anarchist periodicals in various different languages, including the French Le Libertaire, the German Die Internationale, the English Man!, the Russian Delo Truda and the Yiddish Fraye Arbeter Shtime. It was at this time that he also began to compile his history of the Russian Revolution. 

In 1927, Volin was caught in the debate over the Platform, which had caused a split in the exiled Russian anarchist movement. Volin himself was extremely critical of the Platform, which he claimed contradicted the anarchist principle of decentralisation and reflected a desire to create an anarchist political party. This split led to a particularly harsh falling-out with Nestor Makhno, who resented Volin's intellectualism. Despite this, the pair managed to reconcile before Makhno's death in 1934, at the behest of Makhno's wife Halyna Kuzmenko, and Volin took up the task of editing and publishing Makhno's memoirs. Along with his criticisms of platformism, Volin also published denunciations of Bolshevism, which he described as "red fascism", comparing the policies of Joseph Stalin to those of Benito Mussolini and Adolf Hitler. He criticised the "anarcho-Bolsheviks", who had favoured collaboration with the Bolshevik government, and was openly critical of the "anarcho-Bolshevik" , who he accused of lacking anarchist convictions. 

He attempted to continue his educational activities by providing free classes about anarchism, but he also needed money to support his family, so he took up a number of jobs in the publishing industry, notably working on a Russian translation of Eugene O'Neill's play Lazarus Laughed. In the wake of the Spanish Revolution of 1936, he briefly worked on the French language organ of the Confederación Nacional del Trabajo, but quit after the organisation joined the government of the Popular Front. Volin lived out the following years in poverty, until André Prudhommeaux provided him a job on the board of his newspaper Terre Libre, which he contributed to in Nîmes.

In 1940, while living in poverty in Marseilles, he completed his work on The Unknown Revolution, a history of the Russian Revolution. Following the invasion of France by Nazi Germany and the establishment of the collaborationist French State, he was driven into hiding due to his Jewish heritage and his anarchist political beliefs. Although his friends Senya Fleshin and Mollie Steimer attempted to convince him to escape to Mexico with them, he resolved to remain in France, as he believed that there would be a revolution following the end of the war. However by the time the liberation of France allowed him to return to Paris, he had contracted tuberculosis. On 18 September 1945, Volin died in a Parisian hospital. His ashes were buried in a niche of the Père Lachaise Cemetery, near the resting place of his comrade Nestor Makhno.

In his obituary to Volin written the month after his death, Victor Serge described him as "one of the most remarkable figures of Russian anarchism, a man of absolute probity and exceptional rigor of thought. ... One must hope that the future will render justice to this intrepidly idealistic revolutionary who was always, in prison, in the poverty of exile, as on the battlefield and in editorial offices, a man of real moral grandeur."

Works

Notes

References

Bibliography

Further reading

External links
 Peter Arshinov, History of the Makhnovist Movement (1918–1921), 1923.
 

1882 births
1945 deaths
20th-century deaths from tuberculosis
20th-century pseudonymous writers
20th-century Russian historians
20th-century Russian Jews
Anarchist theorists
Anarcho-syndicalists
Burials at Père Lachaise Cemetery
Emigrants from the Russian Empire to France
Emigrants from the Russian Empire to the United States
English-language writers
French people of Russian-Jewish descent
German-language writers
Historians of anarchism
Holocaust survivors
Jewish anarchists
Jewish historians
Jewish Russian politicians
Jewish Russian writers
Jewish trade unionists
Jewish writers from the Russian Empire
Makhnovshchina
Multilingual writers
People from Voronezh
People of the 1905 Russian Revolution
People of the Russian Revolution
People who emigrated to escape Bolshevism
Russian anarchists
Russian anti–World War I activists
Russian Empire escapees
Russian-language writers
Russian political prisoners
Russian prisoners and detainees
Russian revolutionaries
Russian writers in French
Saint Petersburg State University alumni
Socialist Revolutionary Party politicians
Soviet anarchists
Soviet emigrants to France
Soviet emigrants to Germany
Soviet expellees
Soviet people of the Ukrainian–Soviet War
Synthesis anarchism
Tuberculosis deaths in France
Writers from Voronezh
Yiddish-language writers